The 2010 Christy Ring Cup is the sixth staging of Ireland's second-tier hurling competition. Carlow were the reigning champions; however, they did not get the chance to defend their title due to their promotion to the GAA Hurling All-Ireland Senior Championship.

The 2010 Christy Ring Cup final was held at Croke Park, Dublin.

Westmeath defeated Kerry by a point.

Calendar

Details

Participating counties

Structure
The tournament has a double elimination format - each team will play at least two games before being knocked out.
The eight teams play four Round 1 matches.
The winners in Round 1 advance to Round 2A.
The losers in Round 1 go into Round 2B.
There are two Round 2A matches.
The winners in Round 2A advance to the semi-finals.
The losers in Round 2A go into the quarter-finals.
There are two Round 2B matches.
The winners in Round 2B advance to the quarter-finals.
The losers in Round 2B go into the relegation playoff.
The losers of the relegation playoff are relegated to the Nicky Rackard Cup for 2011.
There are two quarter-final matches between the Round 2A losers and Round 2B winners.
The winners of the quarter-finals advance to the semi-finals.
The losers of the quarter-finals are eliminated.
There are two semi-final matches between the Round 2A winners and the quarter-final winners.
The winners of the semi-finals advance to the final.
The losers of the semi-finals are eliminated.
The winners of the final win the Christy Ring Cup for 2010 and are promoted to the Liam MacCarthy Cup 2011.

Fixtures

Round 1

Round 2A

Round 2B

Quarter-finals

Semi-finals

Final

Scoring

Widest winning margin: 11 points
Kildare 2-18 - 1-10 Meath (Round 1)
Most goals in a match: 8
Westmeath 5-15 - 3-16 Derry (Round 1)
Most points in a match: 46
Down 1-19 - 0-27 Kerry (Round 1)
Most goals by one team in a match: 5
Westmeath 5-15 - 3-16 Derry (Round 1)
Most goals scored by a losing team: 3
Derry 3-16 - 5-15 Westmeath (Round 1)
Most points scored by a losing team: 19
Down 1-19 - 0-27 Kerry (Round 1)

Top scorers

Season

Single game

References

Christy Ring Cup
Christy Ring Cup